Guy is a city in Faulkner County, Arkansas, United States. The population was 708 at the 2010 census, up from 202 at the 2000 census. It is part of the Little Rock–North Little Rock–Conway Metropolitan Statistical Area.

Geography
Guy is located in northern Faulkner County at  (35.324584, -92.334935). Arkansas Highway 25 passes through the town, leading northeast  to Quitman and southwest  to Greenbrier.

Demographics

As of the census of 2000, there were 202 people, 84 households, and 65 families residing in the town. The population density was 219.4 inhabitants per square mile (84.8/km2). The racial makeup of the town was 96.04% White, 0.50% Black or African American, and 3.47% from two or more races.

There were 84 households, out of which 31.0% had children under the age of 18 living with them, 65.5% were married couples living together, 9.5% had a female householder with no husband present, and 22.6% were non-families. 21.4% of all households were made up of individuals, and 8.3% had someone living alone who was 65 years of age or older.  The average household size was 2.40 and the average family size was 2.74.

In the town the population was spread out, with 20.8% under the age of 18, 7.4% from 18 to 24, 30.7% from 25 to 44, 26.7% from 45 to 64, and 14.4% who were 65 years of age or older.  The median age was 40 years. For every 100 females, there were 83.6 males.  For every 100 females age 18 and over, there were 92.8 males.

The median income for a household in the town was $35,625, and the median income for a family was $38,977. Males had a median income of $26,875 versus $23,750 for females. The per capita income for the town was $15,732.  About 10.2% of families and 14.0% of the population were below the poverty line, including 16.2% of those under the age of eighteen and 7.1% of those 65 or over.

Education

Public education for elementary and secondary school students in the area is served by the Guy–Perkins School District, which leads to graduation from Guy–Perkins High School. The Guy-Perkins school was circa 2015 placed on the Arkansas State Board of Educations fiscal distress list, with the school having said to be in excess of $2 million in debt.

A small section of the city extends into the South Side School District.

Unusual geologic activity

Starting on September 20, 2010 (of which the event on February 27, 2011, was the largest, at magnitude 4.7), the area around Guy was plagued by more than 500 earthquakes. The temblors, ranging from 1.8 (barely noticeable) to 4.7 (very obvious), are being investigated by the US Geological Survey and the Arkansas Oil and Gas Commission. The quakes may be related to the injection of salt and other waste water into deep wells to dispose of the fluid without contaminating surface or ground water.

See also

 List of cities in Arkansas

References

External links

Cities in Faulkner County, Arkansas
Cities in Arkansas
Cities in Little Rock–North Little Rock–Conway metropolitan area